Sumit Vats (born 17 March 1982 as confirmed by Sumit Vats) is an Indian actor. He is known for playing the lead role of Rishi in Hitler Didi on Zee TV.

Personal life
Sumit was born on 17 March 1982 (confirmed by Sumit Vats) and brought up in Delhi. He did his graduation from Bhagat Singh College, Delhi and his postgraduation in journalism from Bharatiya Vidya Bhavan. After his last show Ajab Gajab Ghar Jamai aired on 13 feb 2015 on big magic Sumit became disappear from TV industry and his interests moved him towards Indian philosophy and spirituality. Sumit became very much philosophic and spiritual as well as he inclined towards literature. By his social media and Instagram posts one can easily understand his deep interest in philosophy, spirituality and literature. Sumit Vats got tremendous popularity by playing the character of "Rishi Kumar" in his Zee TV's daily soap opera Hitler Didi. He showed his great acting skills in the show. Sumit has chosen to stay away from the glamour and stardom of the film and TV industry. Sumit seemed to develop deep inclination towards Osho Rajneesh and LordGautama Buddha philosophy. His last work as an actor could be seen in the Bollywood movie Ramratan released on 6 October 2017 in which he played the role of Happy Singh.

Career
Sumit made his career with the role of Dwarak in Kashi – Ab Na Rahe Tera Kagaz Kora on Imagine TV. He also played in 12/24 Karol Bagh as Raman on Zee TV, Surya The Super Cop as Investigating Officer Chirag on Sony TV and Mukti Bandhan on Colors TV as Jimmy & Chintoo Chautala in BIG Magic's show Ajab Gajab Ghar Jamai. His daily soap opera Hitler didi (Sister Hitler) aired on Zee TV from 7 November 2011 to 2 August 2013 and was dubbed in Arabic, French, and English. The Arabic version aired on Zee Alwan in Dubai and the Middle East from 18 December 2014. Vats plays the role of 'Happy Singh' in the Bollywood movie Ramratan, released on 6 October 2017.He also appeared in The Big Bull as a Hari vyas.

Filmography

Television

Films

Awards

References

External links

Living people
1982 births
Indian male soap opera actors
People from Delhi
Indian male television actors
Male actors from New Delhi